Dan Guenther (born 1944 in Waukegan, Illinois), is an American novelist and poet. A graduate of Coe College, he has a Master of Fine Arts from the Iowa Writers' Workshop. He was a captain in the U.S. Marine Corps. His poems and letters from Vietnam, during the Vietnam War, were included in the acclaimed novel, The Stones of Summer by Dow Mossman, published by Bobbs-Merrill in 1972 and republished by Barnes & Noble in 2003. In 2002, Guenther appeared in the documentary film Stone Reader by Mark Moskowitz. The film chronicled the director's attempt to revive and have republished the acclaimed book of seemingly vanished author Dow Mossman, a lifelong friend of Dan Guenther. The revival was successful.

High Country Solitudes (Grand River, 1997) is Dan Guenther's first book of poetry. He also has published poems in small magazines 

and anthologies, most recently, Open Range: Poetry of the Reimagined West, Ghost Road Press, 2007, and The Quadrant Book of Poetry 2001 – 2010, Quadrant Books, 2012, Sydney, Australia.

China Wind, the first novel in the Vietnam trilogy, was originally published in 1990. Dodge City Blues, the second novel in the trilogy, was published in 2007 and has been praised by Veteran Magazine for its realism. The third novel, Townsend's Solitaire, was published in 2008 and has been described by Veteran Magazine as Sam Gatlin's "readjustment blues."

Glossy Black Cockatoos, Guenther's fourth novel, was published in late 2009. It is set in Australia and Asia, among the Hmong. 
The Colorado Authors' League judged Glossy Black Cockatoos the Best Genre Fiction of 2010.

The Crooked Truth, Dan Guenther's second volume of poetry, was the 2011 winner for Poetry book in the Colorado Authors' League
open competition. About The Crooked Truth, Vietnam Veterans Magazine literary critic David Willson stated, "There is no mawkish sentimentality anywhere in this little book because of Guenther’s plain-yet-elegant language. Dan Guenther remains one of the finest poets of the Vietnam War."

Bibliography
Fiction
China Wind, (Ivy Books, 1990); Redburn Press, 2006
Dodge City Blues, Redburn Press, 2007
Townsend's Solitaire, Redburn Press, 2008
Glossy Black Cockatoos, Redburn Press, 2009
Poetry
High Country Solitudes, Grand River Press, 1997
The Crooked Truth, Redburn Press, 2010

Anthologies containing poetry
Open Range: Poetry Of The Reimagined West, Ghost Road Press
The Quadrant Book of Poetry 2001 – 2010, Quadrant Books, Sydney, Australia

Anthologies containing essays

An Elevated View, Colorado Writers on Writing, Seven Oaks Publishing, 2011

Documentary Film Credits
Stone Reader (2002)

Awards
Colorado Author Award 2008

Colorado Author Best Genre Fiction 2010

Colorado Author Award 2011

Military awards and aecorations

  Bronze Star with 'V' for Valor (Vietnam 1969)
  Combat Action Ribbon
  Navy and Marine Corps Presidential Unit Citation
  Meritorious Unit Commendation
  National Defense Service Medal
  RVN Vietnam Campaign Medal
  RVN Staff Service Medal - 1st Class (Vietnam 1969)
  RVN Gallantry Cross Unit Citation with Palm
  RVN Civil Action Unit Citation
  Vietnam Service Medal (4 campaign stars, Vietnam 1968-70)

References

External links
Colorado Authors League
Colorado Poets Center Biography
Colorado Poets Center Interview, 2012
Colorado State University Libraries
Best Fiction Writers from the Denver Area
Arts of War on the Web
Vietnam Veterans of America Books in Brief

1944 births
Living people
20th-century American novelists
21st-century American novelists
American male novelists
United States Marine Corps personnel of the Vietnam War
Iowa Writers' Workshop alumni
Coe College alumni
20th-century American poets
21st-century American poets
American male poets
United States Marine Corps officers
20th-century American male writers
21st-century American male writers